Statue of Charles Sumner may refer to:

 Statue of Charles Sumner (Boston)
 Statue of Charles Sumner (Cambridge, Massachusetts)